Two ships of the Royal Navy have borne the name HMS Snowdrop after the flower, the Snowdrop:

  was an  sloop launched in 1915 and sold in 1923.
  was a  launched in 1940, sold in 1947 and broken up in 1949.

Royal Navy ship names